Black Ankle Creek is a stream in the U.S. state of Georgia.

Black Ankle Creek was so named on account of the dark character of the rich soil along its course.

References

Rivers of Georgia (U.S. state)
Rivers of Fannin County, Georgia